The Shahpar ll is an unmanned combat aerial vehicle (UCAV) built by Global Industrial Defence Solutions of Pakistan. It is currently in production following the completion of a test and qualification phase.

According to an engineer of AERO (Advanced Engineering Research Organisation), one of the seven companies forming the  GIDS consortium, the only parts of the Shahpar aircraft system not produced in Pakistan are the engine and tires. The sensor suite, a multi-sensor turret designated "Zumr-II (EO/IR)", is built at an AERO facility near Islamabad. The design features a pusher engine with canard foreplanes in front of the wings.

The Shahpar II is designed to autonomously take off and land on a runway or land with a parachute. Payloads are available for reconnaissance and day/night surveillance. Targets on the ground can be geo-referenced and geo-pointed by the avionics. The military standard hardware is built to Environmental Standard 810F. Ground equipment is capable of mission planning and simulation; mission management and control as well as debriefing of ground crew.
 An upgraded version Shappar-2 block Ⅱ has been launched which boasts higher service ceiling and longer flight time.

Development 
On March 23, 2021, Shahpar-II drone was first exhibited publicly during the Pakistan Day parade. It was being developed as an improved version of GIDS Shahpar.

On 28 November 2021, at EDEX 2021 Operational specifications were unveiled by GIDS and a promotional video of Shahpur-II drone showing its locating, tracking and targeting capabilities as surveillance and ground attack drone. Zumr-II (EO/IR) turret was also unveiled as an improved and lighter version of Zumr-I (EP) turret. Targeting / surveillance Turret is installed as internal payload. Drone can also be equipped with other targeting system available from foreign supplier. Drone can also be equipped with SAR, COMINT/ELINT payload. For sensors and targeting systems drone has an internal hard-point where it carry  payload. (Zumr-I weighs  while Zumr-II weighs ). The drone has two external hard-points where it can carry Laser guided weapons, AGMs  each. The promo shows Shahpur-II drone firing Barq laser guided ASM on moving and still targets with high accuracy.

Features 
– Improved Aerodynamics & Structure

– Enhanced Payload Options (ie COMINT/ELINT, SAR. EO/IR)

– SATCOM capable

– Mid-air Engine restart capability Equipped with ATC transponder/Provision of IFF

– Provision of Internal Pilot Enhanced Propulsion System

– Retractable Landing Gears

– Asymmetric landing

Specifications

See also

References

Airborne military robots
Single-engined pusher aircraft
Pakistan Army
Pakistan Air Force
Science and technology in Pakistan
Unmanned military aircraft of Pakistan